The Virginia Slims of Newport is a defunct WTA Tour affiliated women's tennis tournament played from 1971 to 1990. It was held at the International Tennis Hall of Fame in Newport, Rhode Island in the United States and played on outdoor grass courts.

Finals

Singles

Doubles

See also
 Hall of Fame Open – men's tournament

References
 WTA Results Archive

External links

 
Grass court tennis tournaments
Recurring sporting events established in 1971
Recurring events disestablished in 1990
Defunct tennis tournaments in the United States
1971 establishments in Rhode Island
1990 disestablishments in Rhode Island

fr:Tournoi de Newport